Silver: Return to Treasure Island is a novel by former British Poet Laureate Andrew Motion, published by Jonathan Cape on 15 March 2012. The book follows Jim Hawkins, son of the character of the same name in Robert Louis Stevenson's 1883 novel Treasure Island, as he and Nat, daughter of Long John Silver, also a character in Treasure Island, return to the island visited by their fathers to claim abandoned bar silver.

References

2012 British novels
Treasure Island
Sequel novels
2012 children's books
Jonathan Cape books